Hsu Shih-hsien (1 April 1908 – 30 June 1983) was a Taiwanese academic and politician.

Born in 1908 in Japanese Taiwan, Hsu opposed colonialism at an early age. As a student, she refused to acknowledge Hirohito's birthday and defended others who spoke Hokkien. Hsu later became the first Taiwanese woman to earn a doctorate.  She was also the first female high school principal and city council member in Taiwan. In 1940, Hsu and her husband established a hospital in Chiayi City.

Hsu joined the Kuomintang after their arrival in Taiwan in 1945, and was later elected to the Taiwan Provincial Assembly. She attempted to withdraw from the party three times, after disagreeing with the suspension of county commissioner Lee Mao-sung before courts had ruled on charges of corruption against him. She was reelected to the Taiwan Provincial Assembly as an independent in April 1957. Hsu was formally expelled from the Kuomintang in 1958, because she had joined the Chinese Local Autonomy Research Society. In 1960, she worked with Lei Chen to establish the China Democracy Party. It was shut down shortly thereafter, and Lei was arrested. Hsu joined the tangwai movement soon afterwards, coordinating a campaign team for independent candidates from January 1961. She was elected mayor of Chiayi City in 1968, and was the first woman to be elected mayor in Taiwan. Hsu left the provincial legislature after four terms to assume the mayoralty. By the end of Hsu's mayoral term in 1972, the Kuomintang had instituted an age limit of 60 for local offices, making it illegal for her to run for a second term. Instead, Hsu campaigned for a seat on the Legislative Yuan, leading the December 1972 elections with the highest vote total. She stepped down in 1981, choosing to launch a second mayoral campaign in Chiayi because the age limit had been lifted. Hsu died in office in 1983.

A museum dedicated to Hsu opened in 2014.

References

1908 births
1983 deaths
Politicians of the Republic of China on Taiwan from Tainan
Mayors of Chiayi
Women mayors of places in Taiwan
Members of the 1st Legislative Yuan in Taiwan
Kyushu University alumni
20th-century Taiwanese women politicians
Taiwanese people of Hoklo descent
Kuomintang politicians in Taiwan
Expelled members of the Kuomintang
Heads of schools in Taiwan
Taiwanese city councilors
Tainan Members of the Legislative Yuan
Yunlin County Members of the Legislative Yuan
Chiayi County Members of the Legislative Yuan
Taiwanese democracy activists